Zamia inermis is a species of plant in the family Zamiaceae. It is endemic to Actopan, Veracruz state, in eastern Mexico. It is a Critically endangered species, threatened by habitat loss.

References

inermis
Endemic flora of Mexico
Flora of Veracruz
Critically endangered biota of Mexico
Critically endangered plants
Taxonomy articles created by Polbot